Lao Zhang's Philosophy is the 1926 debut novel of Chinese author Lao She, written while Lao She was teaching at London University's School of Oriental Studies (SOS). The novel was a resounding success back in China, and encouraged Lao She to immediately write a second novel set in the same Beijing milieu, Zhao Ziyue, the following year.

References

1926 novels
Novels by Lao She
Novels set in Beijing